Pietro Generali (born October 19, 1958 in Bologna) is a former basketball player from Italy, who won the silver medal with his national team at the 1980 Summer Olympics in Moscow.

References

1958 births
Living people
Sportspeople from Bologna
Italian men's basketball players
Olympic basketball players of Italy
Basketball players at the 1980 Summer Olympics
Olympic medalists in basketball
Medalists at the 1980 Summer Olympics
Olympic silver medalists for Italy